Jean-Baptiste-Henri Féretier (Nantes, 18 December 1765 - Nantes, 11 January 1832) was a French navy officer.

Family 
Son of Jean Feretier, a master tailor in Nantes, he married, in 1806, Louise Modeste Bellanger, niece of Mathieu Augustin Cornet.

Career 
Féretier became an ensign in 1795 on board of the corvette 'L'Insolent', rose to Lieutenant in 1803.

He took command of the frigate Caroline when her master, Captain Billard, died.

During the British Raid on Saint-Paul he had to beach and abandon his frigate to avoid being captured. Brenton (p. 399) incorrectly states that Feretier committed suicide following the loss of his ship but James (p. 200) refutes this statement, affirming that Des Bruslys was the only known suicide during the campaign.

He was promoted to Commander in 1810.

In December 1811, he was appointed commander of a squadron by the Emperor Napoléon.

Feretier commanded the frigate Ariane. The squadron also comprised the Andromaque, under Captain Nicolas Morice, and the 16-gun Mamelouk, under Captain Galbert. The squadron raided American commerce, capturing a number of prizes. The campaign was successful, but as they returned to Lorient, on 22 May 1812, the squadron met the 74-gun HMS Northumberland, resulting in the action of 22 May 1812. After a gunnery exchange, Andromaque caught fire, and both frigates ran aground to save their crew; Andromaque exploded soon afterwards, and Ariane was set afire to prevent her capture.

Féretier and Morice were court-martialed for the loss of their ships, stripped of their rank and barred from commanding a ship for three years. They were however quickly reintegrated.

Honours 
 Legion of Honour
 Order of Saint Louis in 1814.

Sources and references 

 Sources : AN – BB4 – 353
 

French Navy officers
1765 births
French naval commanders of the Napoleonic Wars
1832 deaths